CFAR may refer to:

 Centre for Freudian Analysis and Research
 Collaborative Forecasting and Replenishment
 CFAR (AM), a radio station (590 AM) licensed to Flin Flon, Manitoba, Canada
 Constant false alarm rate
 Center for Applied Rationality